Cortinarius caperatus is an edible mushroom of the genus Cortinarius found in northern regions of Europe and North America. It was known as Rozites caperata for many years before genetic studies revealed that it belonged to the genus Cortinarius. The fruit bodies appear in autumn in coniferous and beech woods as well as heathlands in late summer and autumn. The ochre-coloured cap is up to 10 cm (4 in) across and has a fibrous surface. The clay-colored gills are attached to the stipe under the cap, and the stipe is whitish with a whitish ring. The Latin specific name, caperatus, means wrinkled, and refers to the distinctive texture of the cap. The flesh has a mild smell and flavor.

Popular with mushroom foragers, C. caperatus is picked seasonally in throughout Europe. Although mild-tasting and highly regarded, the mushrooms are often infested with maggots. In central Europe, old specimens could be confused with the poisonous Inosperma erubescens in summer. Fruiting bodies of C. caperatus have been found to bioaccumulate mercury and radioactive isotopes of caesium.

Taxonomy 
The mushroom was originally described as Agaricus caperatus in 1796 by South African mycologist Christiaan Hendrik Persoon, who noted it grew in beech woods. The specific epithet caperatus is Latin for "wrinkled". Bohemian naturalist Julius Vincenz von Krombholz illustrated it in his Naturgetreue Abbildungen und Beschreibungen der essbaren, schädlichen und verdächtigen Schwämme, published between 1831 and 1846. It was transferred to the genus Cortinarius by the Swedish mycologist Elias Magnus Fries in 1838. Later it was transferred to Pholiota in 1874 by French mycologist Claude Casimir Gillet, a placement followed by Italian naturalist Pier Andrea Saccardo. Finnish mycologist Petter Adolf Karsten established the genus Rozites in 1879 to accommodate the species—as Rozites caperatus—on the basis of the mushroom having a double veil; that is, a partial veil—the remnants of which become a ring on the stipe—as well as a universal veil. It was known as a Rozites species for many years. Meanwhile, French mycologist Lucien Quélet classified Pholiota as a subgenus of Dryophila in 1886, resulting in Dryophila caperata being added to the species' synonymy. Worthington George Smith placed it in his new genus Togaria (now considered a synonym of Agrocybe).

Genetic analysis in 2000 and 2002 showed that Rozites was not a discrete group and its members were nested within Cortinarius. This fungus was found to be closely related to the New Zealand species C. meleagris and C. subcastanellus, both also formerly of Rozites. Hence it has once more been placed within Cortinarius. Within the genus it is classified in the subgenus Cortinarius.

Common names include the gypsy mushroom, gypsy, and wrinkled rozites. In Finland, the common name is granny's nightcap.

Description 

C. caperatus has a buff to brownish-ochre cap 5–10 cm (2–4 in) diameter, which is covered with whitish fibres. The surface has a wrinkled and furrowed texture. It may have a lilac tinge when young. It is convex initially before expanding and flattening with a boss (umbo) in the centre. Also known as a partial veil, this is a key identifying feature of the mushroom. The clay-coloured gills are free—they do not reach the stipe under the cap. The spores give an ochre-brown spore print, and the warty almond-shaped spores measure 10–13 µm long by 8–9 µm wide. The flesh is cream-coloured and the flavor mild.

Similar-looking North American species include Agrocybe praecox, which lacks the wrinkled cap and is found in cultivated areas, and Phaeolepiota aurea, which has powdery-granular surface. In central Europe, old specimens could be mistaken for the highly poisonous Inosperma erubescens in summer, and young mushrooms for the inedible Cortinarius traganus, although the latter is readily distinguished by its unpleasant odour.

Distribution and habitat 
C. caperatus is found across northern Europe, mainly in Scandinavia, where it is common, although it is uncommon in Denmark and Iceland. In the British Isles it is uncommon outside the Scottish Highlands and the New Forest. It has been classified as vulnerable in Germany and Great Britain and endangered in the Netherlands. C. caperatus had become less common in the vicinity of Salzburg in Austria between 1937 and 1988, thought due to picking.

It is widely found in northern parts of North America, as far south as Mendocino County on the west coast. It is uncommon in California. C. caperatus is a rare component of subarctic areas of western Greenland. The fungus also grows in temperate Asia, having been recorded growing with bilberry near oriental beech (Fagus orientalis) and fir near Pamukova in the Marmara Region of Turkey. It is also found in boggy areas of the taiga (boreal pine forest) in western Siberia.

Fruiting bodies sprout from August to October in conifer and beech woods, as well as heather (often close by sphagnum) in Scotland. It is mycorrhizal but non-selective in its hosts. Mushrooms appear from September to November in North America, and July and August in Alaska. It prefers acidic and sandy soils and avoids chalky ones, and may be found in the same habitats as bay bolete (Imleria badia), brown rollrim (Paxillus involutus), and chanterelles. It forms relationships with Scots pine (Pinus sylvestris). It is often found under Sitka spruce (Picea sitchensis), or near huckleberry in North America. In Alaska it grows with dwarf birch (Betula nana) and American dwarf birch (B. glandulosa). In Greenland, it grows in association with white birch (Betula pubescens).

Edibility 

C. caperatus is a highly regarded edible mushroom with a mild to good flavour. It is said to mix well with stronger-flavoured fungi such as chanterelles, boletes, brittlegills or milk-caps. The mushroom can have a faintly bitter taste if eaten raw, but a pleasant nutty flavour when cooked. It can readily be dried for later use, such as adding to soups and stews. It is sold commercially in Finland, and is a popular target of foragers in many parts of Europe. The mushrooms are often found to be infested with maggots when picked. Mycologist David Arora recommends discarding the tough stipes.

Radioactivity and environmental contamination
The popularity of C. caperatus across Europe has led to safety concerns related to its propensity to accumulate contaminants. Fungi are very efficient at absorbing radioactive isotopes of caesium from the soil and naturally have trace amounts of the element. Caesium may take the place of potassium, which exists in high concentrations in mushrooms. C. caperatus bioaccumulates radioactive caesium 137Cs—a product of nuclear testing—much more than many other mushroom species. Levels dramatically rose after the 1986 Chernobyl disaster. This is a potential health issue as picking and eating wild mushrooms is a popular pastime in central and eastern Europe. Elevated 137Cs levels were also found in ruminants that eat mushrooms in Scandinavia in the 1990s. Mushrooms from Reggio Emilia in Italy were found to have raised levels of 134Cs. C. caperatus from various sites across Poland has also been found to contain increased levels of mercury.

See also 

 List of Cortinarius species

References

External links 
 

caperatus
Fungi of Europe
Fungi of North America
Fungi of Asia
Edible fungi
Taxa named by Christiaan Hendrik Persoon
Fungi described in 1796
Fungi of Iceland